Ein HaBesor is a moshav in southern Israel. Located in the Hevel Eshkol area of the north-western Negev desert near the border with the Gaza Strip and around a kilometre from Magen, it falls under the jurisdiction of Eshkol Regional Council.

History
Ein Besor was an Egyptian First Dynasty staging post along the "ways of Horus" trade route in the northern Negev. The staging post was contemporary with Tell es-Sakan. The modern moshav was established in 1982. Some of the residents were from Sadot, an Israeli settlement in the Sinai Peninsula evacuated after signing of the Egypt–Israel peace treaty.

References

External links
Ein HaBesor  Negev information Center 
Ein Habsor  Ein Habsor official site 

Archaeological sites in Israel
Moshavim
Populated places established in 1982
Gaza envelope
Populated places in Southern District (Israel)
1982 establishments in Israel